Zookeeper, a.k.a. Dr. Samuel Register, is a fictional character from the Teen Titans comics.

Publication history
Zookeeper first appeared in Teen Titans #13-15 (Sep. - Nov. 2004) and was created by Geoff Johns and Tom Grummett.

Fictional character biography
Dr. Samuel Register worked with Mark and Marie Logan in Africa. He despised their rambunctious son Garfield who constantly caused damage in his lab. He was (and still is) obsessed with people calling him "Dr. Register" and nothing else.

After Logan's parents successfully cured Garfield of Sakutia, Register went on to try to finish their work. He became mad for results and inhumanly slaughtered animals in experiments which produced grotesque mutations. This earned him the nickname "Zookeeper".

In the "Beast Boys and Girls" storyline, Register stole a sample of Sakutia to try to mutate it like Garfield's parents did. He accidentally infected himself and every kid in San Francisco, and the infection turned his skin purple. When Beast Boy was infected, the virus in him was canceled out and he was cured.

Zookeeper injected venom from the Sydney funnel-web spider into Garfield and attempted to dissect and extract the cure to Sakutia from him. Cyborg and the other Titans kept Register busy while Raven healed Beast Boy. Wanting to stop Zookeeper desperately, Garfield reinfected himself with Sakutia. His powers back to speed, Beast Boy fought and defeated Zookeeper in a shapeshifting battle. He also found a way to cure the kids that were infected. Apparently, Register is immune to Sakutia like Beast Boy.

During the Villains United Infinite Crisis Special, Mammoth broke Zookeeper out of prison. He then joined Alexander Luthor, Jr.'s Secret Society of Super Villains.

Some time later, Zookeeper was recruited by Superboy-Prime as part of a new version of the Legion of Doom.

Powers and abilities 
Zookeeper can turn into any animal at will, just like Beast Boy. However, his side effects are different from Garfield's. His skin is purple and scaly and his eyes and hair did not change color with his skin.

References

External links
 Zookeeper at Titans Tower

Characters created by Geoff Johns
Comics characters introduced in 2004
DC Comics characters who are shapeshifters
DC Comics male supervillains
DC Comics scientists
Fictional mad scientists
Fictional therianthropes
DC Comics metahumans